West Serbia or Western Serbia may refer to:

 in geography, western regions of the modern Republic of Serbia
 in administration, statistical region of Šumadija and Western Serbia

See also
 Serbia (disambiguation)
 North Serbia (disambiguation)
 East Serbia (disambiguation)
 South Serbia (disambiguation)